Gleb Chugunov (born 17 December 1999) is an international speedway rider from Russia, who rides on a Polish licence.

Speedway career 
Chugunov won a bronze medal at the Speedway World Cup in the 2017 Speedway World Cup. The following year the competition was rebranded as the Speedway of Nations and Chugunov has twice been credited with a gold medal for being part of the victorious Russian side in 2018 and 2019. 

In 2020, he switched his licence and now represents Poland. Chugunov controversially revealed that he married a Polish girl in order to obtain a Polish racing licence. The marriage allowed him to race while Russian riders were banned.

He signed for GKM Grudziądz for the 2023 Polish speedway season.

Major results

World individual Championship
2020 Speedway Grand Prix - 16th (6pts)
2021 Speedway Grand Prix - 19th (8pts)
2022 Speedway Grand Prix - 20th (7pts)

World Cup
 2017 -  Leszno, Stadion Alfreda Smoczyka (with Emil Sayfutdinov / Vadim Tarasenko / Andrey Kudriashov) - 3rd - 18pts

Speedway of Nations
 2018 -  Tolyatti, Anatoly Stepanov Stadium (with Emil Sayfutdinov / Artem Laguta ) - 1st
 2019 -  Wrocław, Olympic Stadium (with Emil Sayfutdinov / Artem Laguta ) - 1st

References 

1999 births
Russian speedway riders
Polish speedway riders
Living people